The Australian Institute of Sport (AIS) competed in the Women's National Basketball League (WNBL) as a team of the AIS Athletes. They won the WNBL Championship just once, in the 1998–99 WNBL season, led by a young Lauren Jackson. The team continued to compete in the WNBL through the 2011–12 season, but withdrew at the end of that season. AIS were largely uncompetitive in their last years in the WNBL, winning only 29 matches and losing 188 in their final ten WNBL seasons, including a two-season record of 1–41 in 2005–06 and 2006–07. The withdrawal was coordinated with Basketball Australia, which sought to address the flagging depth in its female junior ranks.

References

Australian Institute of Sport (WNBL)
Defunct Women's National Basketball League teams
Basketball teams in the Australian Capital Territory
Basketball teams established in 1983
Basketball teams disestablished in 2012
1983 establishments in Australia
2012 disestablishments in Australia
Defunct sporting clubs in Canberra